Yaariyan is a 2008 Punjabi film, produced by Pinky Basrao starring Gurdas Maan as the male lead and Bhumika Chawla playing his love interest. Directed by Deepak Grewal, the film also stars Om Puri and Gulshan Grover. There is also a special appearance by Asrani.

Plot
Jasawar (Gurdas Mann) a lawyer from Punjab comes to Canada to work as a lawyer, but was unable to work as a lawyer and does other jobs. He falls in love with Bhumika Chawla. He met an accident and plot an easy money case along with his helping hand Khanna, Gulshan Grover, he later finds out that the driver he was suing was the uncle of his lover yet he continues to sue.

Cast 
 Gurdas Mann as Jasawar
 Bhumika Chawla as Simran
 Om Puri
 Gulshan Grover
 Asrani

Music
Sachin Ahuja, Jaidev Kumar and Onkar composed the music while the film score is composed by Aadesh Shrivastava. The song listing is as follows. Music was Released on Universal .

References

External links
 
 Yaariyan official site

2008 films
Punjabi-language Indian films
2000s Punjabi-language films
Films scored by Jaidev Kumar
Films scored by Sachin Ahuja
Films scored by Onkar
Films scored by Aadesh Shrivastava
Films shot in Canada